The men's featherweight boxing competitions at the 2022 Commonwealth Games in Birmingham, England took place between July 30 and August 7 at National Exhibition Centre Hall 4. Featherweights were limited to those boxers weighing less than 57 kilograms.

Like all Commonwealth boxing events, the competition was a straight single-elimination tournament. Both semifinal losers were awarded bronze medals, so no boxers competed again after their first loss. Bouts consisted of three rounds of three minutes each, with one-minute breaks between rounds.

Schedule
The schedule is as follows:

Results
The draw is as follows:

Finals

Top half
{{16TeamBracket|compact=y|seeds=n|byes=1
| RD1=Preliminaries
| RD2=Preliminaries
| RD3=Quarterfinals
| RD4=Semifinals
| team-width=200

| RD1-team03=
| RD1-score03=4
| RD1-team04=
| RD1-score04=1

| RD1-team05=
| RD1-score05=0
| RD1-team06=
| RD1-score06=5

| RD1-team11=
| RD1-score11= 0
| RD1-team12=
| RD1-score12=5

| RD1-team13=
| RD1-score13=2
| RD1-team14=
| RD1-score14=3

| RD2-team01=
| RD2-score01=3
| RD2-team02=
| RD2-score02=2

| RD2-team03=
| RD2-score03=
| RD2-team04=
| RD2-score04=

| RD2-team05=
| RD2-score05=0
| RD2-team06= 
| RD2-score06=5

| RD2-team07=
| RD2-score07= 
| RD2-team08='''

Bottom half

References

External link
Results

Boxing at the 2022 Commonwealth Games